The Hyundai Motor Group (HMG; ; ; stylized as HYUNDAI) is a South Korean chaebol (loosely similar to a  multinational conglomerate but without a central holding company or ownership structure) headquartered in Seoul, South Korea. 

The HMG also refers to the group of affiliated companies interconnected by complex shareholding arrangements, with Hyundai Motor Company regarded as the de facto representative of the group. It is the third-largest South Korean chaebol, after Samsung Group and SK Group, related to other Hyundai-name industries following a specialized development split and restructuring which resulted in Hyundai Motor group, Hyundai Heavy Industries Group, Hyundai Development Company Group, Hyundai Department Store Group, and Hyundai Marine & Fire Insurance.

History 
The group was formed through the purchase of 51% of Kia by Hyundai Motor Company in 1998. As of 2011, Hyundai owns 33.7% of Kia Motors.

On May 22, 2022, the Hyundai Motor Group announced the company would invest in additional $5 billion in the United States by the year 2025. The investment would strengthen collaboration with US firms in areas such as; urban air mobility, autonomous driving, artificial intelligence, and robotics. The investments were announced during a visit to South Korea by President Biden.

Businesses
The largest member of the chaebol, Hyundai Motor Company, has a controlling stake in Kia, and they are the largest and second largest car manufacturers in the country respectively. Following several years of rapid growth, the Group sold 8.01 million vehicles in 2015, falling short of its sales target. In 2017 the Group sold 7.25 million vehicles, the lowest in five years at that point. According to the Organisation Internationale des Constructeurs d'Automobiles, it was the world's third-largest vehicle manufacturer by production volume in 2017, behind Japanese Toyota and German Volkswagen Group.

Affiliates 

 Automobile
 Hyundai Motor Company
 Kia
 Genesis Motor
 Rimac Automobili
 Ioniq
 Manufacturing
 Hyundai Steel
 Hyundai Rotem
 Auto parts
 Hyundai Mobis
 Hyundai IHL
 Hyundai Wia
 Construction
 Hyundai Engineering & Construction
 Hyundai Engineering (HEC)
 Finance
 Hyundai Capital
 Hyundai Card
 Others
 Boston Dynamics
 Hyundai Glovis
 Hyundai AutoEver

Hydrogen 
Hydrogen Wave global online forum was held on September 7, 2021. Hyundai Motor Group (the Group) set out the vision of the hydrogen business and the substance of hydrogen fuel cells and hydrogen mobility. In addition, the Group has set out Hydrogen Vision 2040.

Vision FK, a high-performance hydrogen fuel cell vehicle, was unveiled. Vision FK does not use standard, common vehicle parts and combines Hydrogen Fuel Cell System and PE System developed under collaboration with Limak. Hydrogen Fuel Cell System is utilized as a main power source during FK’s low speed driving or for the management of battery condition. Two of 2kg hydrogen fuel tanks are located above rear axle. Also, the 2nd generation fuel cell stacks, with the power of average 85kW to maximum 95kW, are located above the front axle. PE System that consists of two motor drives, decelerator, inverter, and battery, helps to exercise power during the high speed or dynamic driving. The total output of two motor drives applied to the rear-wheel is over 500kW.

In December 2021, Hyundai suspended development of its Genesis, and possibly its other, hydrogen cars.

Sports marketing

Hyundai Motor Company 

 Jeonbuk Hyundai Motors FC
 FIFA World Cup
 UEFA Euro
 Korea Football Association
 International Ski Federation
 International Cricket Council
 Indian national cricket team
 A-League
 Olympique Lyonnais
 PFC CSKA Moscow
 Millonarios Fútbol Club
 National Football League
 Hyundai Motorsport
 ICC Champions Trophy
 Hyundai Tournament of Champions
 FIS Ski Jumping World Cup
 FIS Ski-Flying World Championships
 FIS Nordic World Ski Championships
 Carlton Football Club
 Brisbane Lions
 Raja Club Athletic
 Wydad Athletic Club
 Chelsea Football Club
 Major League Baseball

Kia 

 Kia Tigers
 FIFA World Cup
 UEFA European Championship
 Copa America
 National Basketball Association
 Liga ACB
 FITA Archery World Cup
 Kia Classic (LPGA)
 Australian Open
 South Korea national speed skating team
 Sociedade Esportiva Palmeiras
 Surrey County Cricket Club
 Williams F1 Team
 Essendon Football Club
 Greater Western Sydney Giants
 Rafael Nadal
 Kia World Extreme Games
 AC Monza
 NBA
 WNBA
 G League

Other affiliate teams 

 Ulsan Mobis Phoebus
 Cheonan Hyundai Capital Skywalkers
 Suwon Hyundai E&C Volleyball Team
 Incheon Hyundai Steel Red Angels

Campaign 

 2015 Going Home - Enabling displaced people to virtually visit their hometown by using 3D restoration technology
 2017 Chatty School Bus - School bus for hearing-impaired children applied with sketchbook window technology
 2018 The Quiet taxi - Taxi applied with audio-tactile conversion (ATC) system for hearing-impaired taxi driver
 2020 Little Big e-Motion - Kids mobility featuring emotion recognition technology
 2021 Dear My Hero - Improving sanitation workers' work environment through hydrogen garbage truck

See also 

 Hyundai
 List of manufacturers by motor vehicle production
 List of Korean car makers

References

External links 

 

 
Battery electric vehicle manufacturers
Vehicle manufacturing companies established in 2000
Conglomerate companies of South Korea
Chaebol
Conglomerate companies established in 2000
South Korean companies established in 2000
Manufacturing companies based in Seoul